The Tonto River is a river of Oaxaca, Mexico that flows from the mountains of Zongolica. It is dammed by the Miguel Alemán Dam near the town of Temascal or Nuevo Soyaltepec, forming the Miguel Alemán Lake.
Below the dam, the river flows southeast past San Juan Bautista Tuxtepec, where it joins the Santo Domingo River to form the Papaloapan River.

See also
List of rivers of Mexico

References

Geography of Mesoamerica
Rivers of Oaxaca
Papaloapan River